Should Wives Work? is a 1937 American short comedy film directed by Leslie Goodwins. In 1937, at the 10th Academy Awards, it was nominated for an Academy Award for Best Short Subject (Two-Reel).

Cast
 Leon Errol as Leon Errol
 Vivien Oakland as Mrs. Errol
 Richard Lane
 William Brisbane
 Laurette Puck
 Isabel La Mal
 Harry Bowen

References

External links

1937 films
1937 comedy films
1937 short films
American black-and-white films
American comedy short films
Films directed by Leslie Goodwins
Films with screenplays by George Jeske
RKO Pictures short films
1930s English-language films
1930s American films